Suspended in Time: An Epic is a 1995 (see 1995 in music) album by Joel Cummins. In 1995, future Umphrey's McGee founder and keyboardist Joel Cummins released this solo piano album, featuring originals such as the future Umphrey's McGee classic "Orfeo" and covers such as Phish's "Magilla." The album has long been out of print.

Track listing
"Prologue"
"Dawn"
"First Movement"
"Rising Bird"
"Orfeo"
"Salamander Strut"
"Magilla"
"Magoo's Blues"
"Harbor Lights"
"Thursday"
"Twilight"
"Darkness"
"Epilogue"

1995 albums